is a Japanese manga series written and illustrated by Misato Konari. It has been serialized in Akita Shoten's josei manga magazine Elegance Eve since June 2016, with its chapters collected into ten tankōbon volumes as of August 2022. A television drama adaptation aired from July to September 2019.

As of January 2021, the manga had over 4 million copies in circulation. In 2019, Nagi no Oitoma won the Excellence Award at the 22nd Japan Media Arts Festival. In 2020, the series won the 65th Shogakukan Manga Award in the shōjo category.

Plot
Nagi Ōshima, a 28-year-old employee, has always made sure not to be noticed, not to make waves and to agree with everyone. Because of this, her colleagues tend to take advantage of her. One day, she finally breaks down and drops everything. After that, Nagi quit her company, disposed of her household goods, moved from the city center to the suburbs, cut off all relationships with everyone, and started her new life from scratch.

Media

Manga
As of August 2022, ten tankōbon volumes have been released.

A spin-off series under the same title was serialized in the  website from January 26, 2017, to April 12, 2018.

Volume list

Drama
In May 2019, a television drama adaptation was announced, starring Haru Kuroki as Nagi Ōshima. It was directed by Toshio Tsuboi, Takeyoshi Yamamoto, Nobuhiro Doi, and Maiko Ōuchi, based on a screenplay written by Satomi Ōshima. Yoshihiko Nakai served as the producer, while Pascals composed the music. The ten-episode series aired on TBS from July 19 to September 20, 2019. Miwa performed the theme song "Reboot".

Reception

Manga
As of January 2021, the manga had over 4 million copies in circulation.

Nagi no Oitoma was nominated for the 11th Manga Taishō in 2018 and ranked 3rd out of twelve nominees with 56 points; it ranked 10th out of thirteen nominees in the 12th edition with 25 points. The series placed 3rd in the 2019 edition of Takarajimasha's Kono Manga ga Sugoi! list of best manga for female readers; it ranked 11th in the 2020 edition. In 2019, the series was nominated for the 23rd Tezuka Osamu Cultural Prize. In the same year, it won the Excellence Award in the Manga Division at the 22nd Japan Media Arts Festival. The series also ranked 9th in Da Vinci magazine's "Book of the Year" list for 2019. It was nominated for the 43rd Kodansha Manga Award in the shōjo category. In 2020, Nagi no Oitoma won the 65th Shogakukan Manga Award in the shōjo category.

Drama
The drama adaptation won the Best Picture Award at the 102nd Television Drama Academy Awards and the 17th Confidence Award Drama Prize in 2019. It won the Excellent Award at the 2020 International Drama Festival in Tokyo.

References

External links
  
 

2019 Japanese television series debuts
2019 Japanese television series endings
Akita Shoten manga
Josei manga
Kin'yō Dorama
Manga adapted into television series
Romantic comedy anime and manga
Winners of the Shogakukan Manga Award for shōjo manga